The Dammam–Riyadh line is a passenger railway line in Saudi Arabia, linking the Eastern Province's capital city of Dammam with the Saudi capital Riyadh. The 449 km line has four stations. It is owned and operated by Saudi Arabia Railways.

History 
The Dammam–Riyadh line was opened in 1981. Planning for the line started in 1947 with an agreement between King Ibn Saud and ARAMCO to lay a 547 km (about 340 mi) freight line. Bechtel Construction Company was chosen to build the rail line and a sea port at the eastern end of the rail line at Dammam. Construction of the line began in September 1947. In 1948, veteran American railroad engineer James H. Gildea was hired to oversee the project. The most serious obstacle to building the rail line was the Persian Gulf shallows at Dammam. To allow deep draft vessels to unload, a rail causeway of approximately seven miles was built out into the Persian Gulf with the first five miles a rock causeway and the last couple of miles a section made of a steel trestle. One of the first vessels to unload was a Dutch freighter, in 1950, with a load of rails for construction of the line. The first trains started moving between Dammam and Riyadh in the early 1950s.

Upgrade 
There is an upgrade ongoing to replace level crossings with grade separations, and to bypass of the centre city of Hofuf. This shall allow 200 km/h speed.

In 2014, the SRO awarded a contract worth US $1.6 million to a consortium led by Spanish firm Consultrans to study alignments for a high-speed line linking Riyadh and Dammam.

In December 2015, the SRO President stated that the speed of trains on the line would be raised from 140 km/h to 160 km/h before the end of the year, and would further be increased to 180 km/h in 2016. On 7 December 2015, SRO began operating passenger services on the line using new CAF push-pull trainsets which operate at 180 km/h. The trains entered service just as the SRO had completed double-tracking of the entire 449 km line.

On 17 February 2017 at about 1:00 am, a train on the line derailed near Dammam, injuring 18 people, after flooding from torrential rains caused the rail line to erode. The train was carrying 193 passengers and six crew members. SRO stated that all injuries were minor. All passengers were transferred to another train and transported to Dammam station. The line was closed for repair following the accident, and SRO suspended all rail services to Dammam. Services were only operated between Riyadh and Hofuf. Full services were resumed by 23 February 2017.

Stations 

The stations at Dammam, Hufuf and Riyadh were designed by Lucio Barbera and designed and built between 1978 and 1980. They were opened for public service in 1981. The terminus stations in Dammam and Riyadh are extremely similar and consist of a  rectangular hall of three naves separated by two lines of pillars along the ends of the tracks and two wings at the ends of the main hall along the outer tracks. The design is based on the layout of some mosques along the Mediterranean Sea, where the prayer hall is located at one side of a court with lesser wings along the sides of the court. The style and decoration of the buildings uses elements such as triangular openings to construct windows and arcades and parapets with rectangular steps, elements bearing a resemblance to Nejd architecture but also common in other Arab architecture. The station building in Hufuf lies to the east of the through-line along one side. The decoration is very similar to the stations in Dammam and Riyadh.

There are four stations on the Dammam–Riyadh line:

Infrastructure

Rolling stock
Spanish manufacturer CAF has in delivered 2012 delivered eight fast diesel locomotives, with one driving van trailer passenger car and four other passenger cars, with a leading power car unit; plus two spare power cars. They are used on the Dammam–Riyadh Line. During 2013 the travel time is 4:15 but there is a target of 3:00 for the future.

Tracks 
The rails on the line are of the type C.W.R UIC 60.

Signaling system 
In 2007, the SRO contracted a consortium made up of Siemens Transportation Systems and the Saudi Arabian Nour Communications Company to modernize both the Dammam–Riyadh line and the cargo line of SRO rail network. The line will be equipped with signalling technology including an electronic interlocking as core of the installation and Trainguard 100 for ETCS Level 1. GSM-Railway (GSM-R) mobile radio technology will be used for communications on the entire rail network.

Operations  
The total journey time is about 4.5 hours. From 1 June 2016, SRO began operating an express train that covered the distance between Riyadh and Dammam in 3 hours 40 minutes. The train departs from Dammam at 9:30AM and from Riyadh at 1:10 PM daily.

References 

 
Siemens Mobility projects